George J. Marrett (born 1935) is a former United States Air Force officer, combat veteran, and test pilot. He is the author of many aviation-related books and articles.

Early life
George Marrett was born in Grand Island, Nebraska in 1935. He was awarded the Eagle rank by the Boy Scouts in 1951. Marrett graduated in 1957 from Iowa State College in Ames, Iowa with a bachelor's degree in Chemistry. He entered the United States Air Force as a Second Lieutenant from the Reserve Officers Training Corps. Marrett received pilot training at Webb Air Force Base in Texas where he flew the Lockheed T-33 Shooting Star. After graduation in 1959, he went to advanced flight training at Moody AFB in Georgia where he flew the North American F-86L Sabre. Marrett spent four years in the 84th Fighter Interceptor Squadron at Hamilton Air Force Base, California, flying the McDonnell F-101B Voodoo.

Test pilot and combat veteran
Marrett was selected to attend the Aerospace Research Pilot School (ARPS), now called the U.S. Air Force Test Pilot School at Edwards Air Force Base, California. While at the school, Marrett flew a variety of aircraft including the Northrop T-38 Talon, Lockheed F-104 Starfighter and General Dynamics F-106 Delta Dart. After graduating with Class 64A, he was assigned to the Fighter Test Branch of Flight Test Operations at Edwards and completed three years flight-testing the McDonnell F-4C Phantom, Northrop F-5A Freedom Fighter, and General Dynamics F-111A Aardvark. Marrett flew during the heyday of flight test when many aviation record were set, such as Colonel Robert 'Silver Fox' Stephens' world speed record in the YF-12.

From 1968 to 1969, Marrett flew the Douglas A-1 Skyraider as a "Sandy" rescue pilot in the 602d Fighter Squadron (C), C for Commando, from Udorn and Nakhon Phanom Royal Thai Air Force Bases, Thailand.

He completed 188 combat missions with over 600 combat hours and was awarded the Distinguished Flying Cross with two Oak Leaf Clusters and the Air Medal with eight Oak Leaf Clusters. He was also awarded the Air Force Commendation Medal for flight test at Edwards AFB.

In 1969, Marrett returned from Vietnam and joined Hughes Aircraft Company as an experimental test pilot. For the next twenty years, he flew test programs which helped develop attack radar and missiles for the Grumman F-14 Tomcat, F-15 Eagle, F-16 Fighting Falcon, F-18 Hornet, and an early version of the B-2 Stealth bomber. He also flew test missions for the Hughes Aircraft AGM-65 Maverick missile. Marrett has flown over 40 types of military aircraft and logged over 9,500 hours.

Sock It To 'Em

Marrett's personal aircraft while serving with the 602d was an A-1J Skyraider, serial number 142029, maintained by crew chief Joseph Toback. The aircraft was named Sock It To 'Em after the popular 1960s comedy television program, Rowan & Martin's Laugh-In. Three weeks after Marrett and Tobak returned home, Sock It To 'Em was shot down by ground fire killing the pilot, Major James East, Jr. Forty-one years later, Marrett and Tobak were reunited at the Estrella Warbird Museum where they flew in Marrett's 1945 Stinson L-5 Sentinel that is also named Sock It To 'Em. The A-1 Skyraider, Sock It To 'Em, was memorialized as a plastic model by the Tamiya Corporation and a die-cast metal model by Hobby Master Limited.

Later years
Marrett retired from Hughes Aircraft in 1989 and lives in Atascadero, California. He is one of the founders of the Estrella Warbird Museum at the Paso Robles airport, where he enjoys flying his privately owned plane, a 1945 Stinson L-5E Sentinel. He was the chief pilot for D. P. Industries from 2000 to 2013 flying their Beechcraft King Air C-90. Marrett has been on the Board of Trustees of the National Test Pilot School in Mojave, California since 1983.

Marrett has been married to his Nebraskan wife, Jan, for 62 years. They have a son Randall who is a retired Professor of Geology at the University of Texas at Austin and another son Scott who volunteers with the National Park Service in Idaho. They have four grandchildren Tyler Marrett, Zachary Marrett, Cali Marrett, and Casey Marrett.

Publications
Marrett started his career as an aviation author by sending short stories to magazines.
He has had nineteen articles published in aviation magazines about military flight test and his experiences in Vietnam. The following is an incomplete list of his works:

Books

Articles

 California Dreaming
 Chasing the XB-70 Valkyrie
 Defending the Golden Gate
 Don't Kill Yourself!
 The Jolly Gets An Assist
 F-101 Voodoo Curse
Mach Buster
 SANDY to the Rescue
 Sky High in a Starfighter
 Sore Feet
 Space Cadets

Honors
Marrett was inducted in the Nebraska Aviation Hall of Fame on January 26, 2006 in Kearney, Nebraska. He was elected to the Grand Island, Nebraska High School Wall of Honor and inducted in October 2007. Marrett joined the Society of Experimental Test Pilots in 1967, upgraded to Associate Fellow in 1981 and was elected a Fellow in 2011. On December 9, 2016 he received the USAF Test Pilot School Distinguished Alumnus award during the graduation ceremony for Class 2016A at Edwards AFB, California. This award is presented to a USAF TPS graduate who has made significant and lasting contributions to aviation science and the flight test community.

See also

 List of U.S. Air Force Test Pilot School alumni

Notes

References

External links
George Marrett A-1 Photos, Skyraider Association, retrieved June 1, 2008.
Tamiya 1/48 scale plastic model of Douglas A-1J Sock It To 'Em, retrieved November 13, 2010.
Hobby Master 1/72 die-cast metal model of Douglas A-1J Sock It To 'Em, retrieved January 3, 2015.
Memorial to Major James East, Jr. killed while flying Douglas A-1J Sock It To 'Em, retrieved January 3, 2015.
 

1935 births
Living people
American aviators
American test pilots
Recipients of the Distinguished Flying Cross (United States)
Recipients of the Air Medal
United States Air Force personnel of the Vietnam War
Aviators from Nebraska
People from Atascadero, California
United States Air Force officers
U.S. Air Force Test Pilot School alumni
People from Grand Island, Nebraska
Military personnel from California